The d-block contraction (sometimes called scandide contraction) is a term used in chemistry to describe the effect of having full d orbitals on the period 4 elements. The elements in question are  gallium, germanium, arsenic, selenium, bromine, and krypton. Their electronic configurations include completely filled d orbitals (d10). The d-block contraction is best illustrated by comparing some properties of the group 13 elements to highlight the effect on gallium.

Gallium can be seen to be anomalous. The most obvious effect is that the sum of the first three ionization potentials of gallium is higher than that of aluminium, whereas the trend in the group would be for it to be lower. The second table below shows the trend in the sum of the first three ionization potentials for the elements B, Al, Sc, Y, and La. Sc, Y, and La have three valence electrons above a noble gas electron core. In contrast to the group 13 elements, this sequence shows a smooth reduction.

Other effects of the d-block contraction are that the Ga3+ ion is smaller than expected, being closer in size to Al3+. Care must be taken in interpreting the ionization potentials for indium and thallium, since other effects, e.g. the inert pair effect, become increasingly important for the heavier members of the group.The cause of the d-block contraction is the poor shielding of the nuclear charge by the electrons in the d orbitals. The outer valence electrons are more strongly attracted by the nucleus causing the observed increase in ionization potentials. The d-block contraction can be compared to the lanthanide contraction, which is caused by inadequate shielding of the nuclear charge by electrons occupying f orbitals.

See also
Periodic table
Electronegativity
Electron affinity
Relativistic quantum theory
Effective nuclear charge
Electron configuration
Exchange interaction
Lanthanide contraction

References

Chemical bonding
Atomic radius